Bouinan is a district in Blida Province, Algeria. It was named after its capital, Bouinan.

Municipalities
The district is further divided into 2 municipalities:
Bouinan
Chébli 

Districts of Blida Province